Ramin Mazaheri (born 21 April 1983) is an Iranian audio engineer, music producer and musician.

He has been cooperating, as an engineer, in the production of several significant albums, such as Aah-Baran (Mohammad-Reza Shajarian), Pieces from Iranian Composers (Tehran Symphonic Orchestra) Mian-e Khorshid Haye Hamisheh (Rastak Ensemble), Science of Rain (Minus1), Rebel (Kourosh Yaghmaei); and some popular TV series, including Mokhtarnameh, Shahrzad, and Shookhi Kardam; He also has produced several tracks for some well-known Iranian singers such as Mazyar Fallahi and Ehsan Haghshenas.

Career 
His career as an engineer started with accepting orders at his home studio in 2001, which he developed gradually. It was after he met Raymond Movsessian, a Professional audio engineer, who guided Ramin on professional levels, that he managed to establish Baran Studio in 2005.

In 2005, he was more productive in recording successful music Albums, In the same year he accepted to work with Raymond Movsessian, as an engineer assistant, at Mohammad Reza Shajarian Concert; He also recorded Naghsh e Khial, an Album by Ali Ghamsarai with Homayoon Shajarian as a vocalist; At the same time he was cooperating with some musicians like Mehdi Moghadam, Nariman, Amir yal Arjomand, Mani Rahnama, etc.

Baran Studio was transferred to a bigger place in 2010. Around this time Ramin cooperated with Mehran Modiri at Shookhi Kardam Series.
He recorded an album alongside Mehdi Paknejad (Setar Player) and Farhad Asadi (Tombak player) in 2011, which was released without any editing or mixing, so they decided to call it "Senavazi" ("Trio"). Shortly after that, they performed these pieces in Roudaki Hall. This was the first time that a sound engineer attended on the stage alongside the instrumentalists and microphones placement and soundcheck in front of the live studio audience.

He has worked in his career with many well-known artists and musicians such as Mohammad-Reza Shajarian, Kayhan Kalhor, Alexander Rahbari, The Kamkars, Shahram Nazeri, Behrouz Gharibpour, Mehdi Bagheri, Salar Aghili, Keyvan Kianian, Homayoun Shajarian, Kaveh Sarvarian, Hamzeh Yeganeh, Ali Shokat, Rastak Ensemble, Minus 1, Mohsen Namjoo, Hamed Behdad, Mehran Modiri, Ajam (band), Aref (singer), Reza Yazdani (singer), Mehdi Moghadam, Mazyar Fallahi, Amir Tavassoli, Farzin Gharahgozloo, Mohammad Reza Jadidi, Mohammad Esfahani, Alireza Assar, Payam Shams, Behrouz Saffarian, Mohammad Mobini, etc.

Reza Abedyan, kamancheh player, in his interview with Melody Magazine, has said: "I felt so much happiness when I heard that for the first time a sound engineer attended on the stage alongside instrumentalists. Because it seems to me that this career always has been ignored by people".

Siamak Gholizadeh, in Etemad News has said: "Of course, the interesting and brilliant mix of Ramin Mazaheri cannot be ignored. The combination of electronic and rock music has rarely happened in Iran before, and this is the band (Baadzang) trump card in creating a new sound."

In 2017 he performed in 32nd Fajr International Music Festival, Research Section, on the "Sound, Recording and Accessories" topic. Also, "Kahgel" the album by Hamzeh Yeganeh, with his mixing and mastering, won the Barbad Award for the best Fusion album at that Festival.
In 2019 he was Judge (Jury) on Naser Farhoudi Award.

He produced video series as known as "The Sound of Music by Ramin Mazaheri" about how to record iranian instruments.

Discography

As engineer (music)

As engineer (soundtrack - score)

As producer

References

External links
 وب سایت رسمی رامین مظاهری

1983 births
Living people
Audio engineers
21st-century Iranian musicians
Iranian record producers